Panfield is a village and civil parish in the Braintree district of Essex, England. It is near the town of Braintree.

The Grade II* listed Anglican parish church is dedicated to St Mary and St Christopher, although listed by Historic England as 'St Mary the Virgin'. Panfield's other listed buildings include the Grade I Panfield Hall, a 16th-century red brick house. Panfield was recorded in the Domesday Book as Penfelda. In 2001 the parish had a population of 850.

No traces remain above ground of the medieval Panfield Priory, an Augustinian monastery sited in Great Priory Farm.

References 

Villages in Essex
Civil parishes in Essex
Braintree District